Boxcar Bertha is a 1972 American romantic crime drama film directed by Martin Scorsese and produced by Roger Corman, from a screenplay by Joyce H. Corrington and John William Corrington, Made on a low budget, the film is loose adaptation of Sister of the Road, a pseudo-autobiographical account of the fictional character Bertha Thompson. It was Scorsese's second feature film.

Plot
Boxcar Bertha Thompson, a poor southern girl, is orphaned when her father's crop dusting airplane crashes. The Great Depression hits, and she soon takes to freighthopping. A few years later, she meets Big Bill Shelly, a union organizer, and they become lovers. Together with Rake Brown, a gambler, and Von Morton, who worked for Bertha's father, they start train and bank robbery by accident, and eventually face up to the railway boss H. Buckram Sartoris in the American South. The group become notorious fugitives of the law and are hunted down by the railway company. In the process, Rake is gunned down and Bill and Von are sent to a chain gang. Bertha escapes but is lured into prostitution. She meets Von by chance in a tavern for blacks and learns that Bill broke the jail and is now in hiding. Von leads Bertha to the hiding place where she has a moment of sweet reunion with Bill before Sartoris's henchmen break in and crucify Bill. Before they can leave, Von appears, wipes out the henchmen and releases Bertha from the bondage.

Cast

Barbara Hershey as Boxcar Bertha
David Carradine as Big Bill Shelly
Barry Primus as Rake Brown
Bernie Casey as Von Morton
John Carradine as Sartoris
Victor Argo as McIver #1
David Osterhout as McIver #2

Production
After the success of Bloody Mama, Roger Corman wanted to make another female gangster film. Julie Corman researched female gangsters and came across the story of Boxcar Bertha. Martin Scorsese was hired to direct on the strength of his first feature. He was given the lead actors, including Barbara Hershey, David Carradine, and Barry Primus, and a shooting schedule of 24 days in Arkansas. The Reader Railroad was used for the train scenes.

The locomotive in those scenes was 1920 Baldwin 2-6-2 #108, which later saw service on the Conway Scenic Railroad in the late 1970s. The engine is  currently at the Blacklands Railroad yard in Sulphur Springs, Texas, awaiting restoration. Locomotive #1702, a USATC S160 2-8-0 built by Baldwin in 1942, was also seen in the film as well. The locomotive is now operational at the Great Smoky Mountains Railroad.

Scorsese makes a cameo in the film as one of Bertha's clients during the brothel montage.

Barbara Hershey later called the film "a lot of fun even though it's terribly crippled by Roger Corman and the violence and sex. But between the actors and Marty Scorsese the director, we had a lot of fun. We really had characters down but one tends to not see all that, because you end up seeing all the blood and sex."

Hershey controversially publicly announced they had filmed the movie's sex scenes "without having to fake anything."

Reception
Boxcar Bertha received mixed reviews from critics. It holds an approval rating of 54% on review aggregator website Rotten Tomatoes based on 24 reviews, with an average rating of 5.1/10. The website's critical consensus says, "Too derivative of other Roger Corman crime pictures to stand out, Boxcar Bertha feels more like a training exercise for a fledgling Martin Scorsese than a fully formed picture in its own right."

Roger Ebert of the Chicago Sun-Times gave the film three stars out of four and called it "a weirdly interesting movie ... Director Martin Scorsese has gone for mood and atmosphere more than for action, and his violence is always blunt and unpleasant — never liberating and exhilarating, as the New Violence is supposed to be. We get the feeling we're inhabiting the dark night of a soul." The New York Times Howard Thompson found the film to be an "interesting surprise," praising Carradine's "excellent" performance and the "beautiful" direction by Scorsese, "who really comes into his own here." Kevin Thomas of the Los Angeles Times wrote, "What is most impressive about Boxcar Bertha ... is how 28-year old director Martin Scorsese, in his first Hollywood venture, has managed to shape such familiar material into a viable film."

Arthur D. Murphy of Variety gave the film a negative review, writing, "Whatever its intentions, Boxcar Bertha is not much more than an excuse to slaughter a lot of people ... The final cut has stripped away whatever mood and motivation may have been in the script, leaving little more than fights, shotgun blasts, beatings and aimless movement." Gene Siskel of the Chicago Tribune gave the film one star out of four and called it a "trashy movie" with violence that "does not shock. It merely depresses." Tom Milne of The Monthly Film Bulletin declared: "Abrasively scripted, stunningly shot, and beautifully acted by David Carradine, Barbara Hershey and Barry Primus in particular, Boxcar Bertha is much more than the exploitation picture it has been written off as (by Variety, for instance) and makes a worthy companion piece to both Bloody Mama and Bonnie and Clyde."

See also
 List of American films of 1972

References

External links

1972 films
1972 crime drama films
1970s American films
1970s crime thriller films
1970s drama road movies
1970s English-language films
American crime drama films
American crime thriller films
American drama road movies
American International Pictures films
American romance films
Biographical films about Depression-era gangsters
Films about the labor movement
Films directed by Martin Scorsese
Films produced by Roger Corman
Films set in Arkansas
Films shot in Arkansas
Great Depression films
Industrial Workers of the World in fiction
Rail transport films
Romantic crime films